The Municipality of Škocjan, established in October 1994, is a municipality in the traditional region of Lower Carniola in southeastern Slovenia. The seat of the municipality is Škocjan. The Municipality of Škocjan is now included in the Southeast Slovenia Statistical Region. The majority of the municipality is part of the Novo Mesto Administrative Unit, except for the northeastern part (Local Community of Bučka), which belongs to the Sevnica Administrative Unit.

Subdivision

The Municipality of Škocjan comprises the following local and village communities:

Local communities
Bučka, comprising the settlements: Bučka, Dolenje Radulje, Dule, Gorenje Radulje, Jarčji Vrh, Jerman Vrh, Močvirje, Štrit and Zaboršt
Škocjan, comprising the settlements: Hrastulje, Osrečje, Segonje, Stara Bučka, Stopno, Škocjan, Zalog pri Škocjanu, Zavinek and Zloganje

Village communities
Dobrava pri Škocjanu and Tomažja Vas, comprising the settlements: Čučja Mlaka, Dobrava pri Škocjanu, Ruhna Vas, Stranje pri Škocjanu and Tomažja Vas
Dole, comprising the settlements: Dolenje Dole, Gorenje Dole, Jelendol and Mačkovec pri Škocjanu
Grmovlje, comprising the settlements: Dobruška Vas, Dolenja Stara Vas, Grmovlje and Hudenje
Zagrad, comprising the settlements: Gabrnik, Goriška Gora, Goriška Vas pri Škocjanu, Gornja Stara Vas, Klenovik, Male Poljane, Velike Poljane and Zagrad

References

External links
 
 Škocjan municipal site
 Municipality of Škocjan at Geopedia

Skocjan
1994 establishments in Slovenia